The following is a list of Michigan State Historic Sites in Emmet County, Michigan. Sites marked with a dagger (†) are also listed on the National Register of Historic Places in Emmet County, Michigan. Those with a double dagger (‡) are also designated National Historic Landmarks.


Current listings

See also
 National Register of Historic Places listings in Emmet County, Michigan

Sources
 Historic Sites Online – Emmet County. Michigan State Housing Developmental Authority. Accessed January 23, 2011.

References

Emmet County
State Historic Sites
Tourist attractions in Emmet County, Michigan